is a railway station in Miyazaki City, Miyazaki Prefecture, Japan.

Lines

Layout 
The station, which is unstaffed, consists of a side platform serving a single track set in a confined urban area among high-rise buildings. The station building is narrow modern wooden structure adorned with a triangular gable and stained glass. The ticket window is unstaffed but an automatic ticket vending machine and SUGOCA card reader is provided. A short flight of steps leads up to the platform.

Adjacent stations

History
JR Kyushu opened the station on 11 March 1989 as an additional station on the existing track of the Nippō Main Line.

Passenger statistics
In fiscal 2016, the station was used by an average of 194 passengers (boarding only) per day.

See also
List of railway stations in Japan

References

External links
Kanō (JR Kyushu)

Railway stations in Miyazaki Prefecture
Railway stations in Japan opened in 1989